Derycke is a surname. It may refer to:

Dinah Derycke (1946–2002), French politician
Erik Derycke (politician) (born 1949), Belgian judge and politician
Erik Derycke (quiz player) (born 1970), Belgian quiz player
Germain Derycke (1929–1978), Belgian road bicycle racer